Nimnim Lake is a lake located south of south end Comox Lake.

References

Alberni Valley
Lakes of Vancouver Island
Newcastle Land District